The Illinois List of Endangered and Threatened Species is reviewed about every five years by the Illinois Endangered Species Protection Board (ESPB). To date it has evaluated only plants and animals of the US state of Illinois, not fungi, algae, or other forms of life; species that occur in Illinois which are listed as endangered or threatened by the U.S. federal government under the Endangered Species Act of 1973 are automatically listed as such for the state of Illinois.

Illinois Endangered Species Protection Board
The Illinois Endangered Species Protection Act created the ESPB in 1972. The board is made up of six naturalists including at least one botanist, two zoologists, and two ecologists. Board members are volunteers, and  include Jeff Walk of The Nature Conservancy, ichthyologist Philip Willink, Joyce Hofmann (chair), Janice Coons (vice-chair), Tracy Evans (secretary), ornithologist , Bruce Ross-Shannon, Jeremie Fant, Randy Schietzelt, Chris Young from the Illinois Department of Natural Resources (non-voting member), and one vacancy. They met most recently in 2019 and penultimately in 2014.

Recovery Plans
Only twenty species ever listed have had Illinois Endangered and Threatened Species Recovery Plans approved by the board, but other parties may implement recovery plans without board approval. Examples of plans implemented by other parties include that for Hine's emerald dragonfly (Somatochlora hineana) headed by the United States Fish and Wildlife Service and Blanding's turtle (Emydoidea blandingii) headed by the Forest Preserve District of DuPage County.
Species with approved recovery plans are: eryngium stem borer (Papaipema eryngii), golden mouse (Ochrotomys nuttalli), American snowbell (Styrax americana), bald eagle (Haliaeetus leucocephalus), barn owl (Tyto alba), beardtongue (Penstemon tubaeflorus), bloodleaf (Iresine rhizomatosa), creeping St. Johnwort (Hypericum adpressum), eastern woodrat (Neotoma floridana), greater prairie-chicken (Tympanuchus cupido), halberd leaf tearthumb (Polygonum arifolium/Tracaulon arifolium), leatherflower (Clematis viorna), marsh rice rat (Oryzomys palustris), mud-plantain (Heteranthera reniformis), northern harrier (Circus cyaneus), osprey (Pandion haliaetus), peregrine falcon (Falco peregrinus), road-winged sedge (Carex alata), royal catchfly (Silene regia), and short-eared owl (Asio flammeus).

List of species

References

Illinois
Illinois
Endangered
Endangered